In accordance with the law, citizens of all countries require a visa to visit Turkmenistan, unless they have special passports. From 2003-2013, people from certain parts of Kazakhstan or Uzbekistan also enjoyed visa exemptions. To obtain a tourist visa for Turkmenistan, all foreign nationals must supply an invitation letter issued by a travel agency licensed in Turkmenistan.

Holders of a letter of invitation issued by a company registered in Turkmenistan with a prior approval from the Ministry of Foreign Affairs can obtain a visa on arrival valid for 10 days, and extendable for another 10 days.

Citizens of all countries have the right to visa-free transit through the international transit area of Ashgabat International Airport.

Visa policy map

Special permits
A special permit, issued prior to arrival by Ministry of Foreign Affairs, is required if visiting the following places: Kerki, Hazar, Dashoguz, Serakhs and Serhetabat.

Special visa exemptions in 2003–2013
From 2003 to 2013, citizens of some regions of neighboring Uzbekistan and Kazakhstan could visit Turkmenistan without a visa with certain conditions.
  — residents (only citizens of the Republic of Kazakhstan) of Atyrau Oblys and Mangystau Oblys have visa free access to Balkan Velayat for up to 5 days in 2003-2013.
  — in 2003-2013 residents (only citizens of the Republic of Uzbekistan) of Khorazm Vilayat and Bukhara Vilayat as well as residents of Amudarya, Khujayli, Shumanay, Qunghirat districts and Takhiatash city of autonomous Republic of Karakalpakstan and residents of Dehqanabad, Ghuzar, Nishan and Mirishkar districts of Qashqadarya Vilayat and residents of Sherabad and Muzrabat districts of Surkhandarya Vilayat have visa free access for up to 3 days within any month period. During Eid al-Fitr and Eid al-Adha the access is allowed twice a month, but no more than 7 days.
  United Nations laissez-passer — from 2003 foreign nationals with UN passports are allowed up to 30 (thirty) calendar days from the date of arrival in Turkmenistan without a visa to come to Turkmenistan, stay in it, travel outside it, cross the border, and cross the territory in transit the territory of Turkmenistan. Foreign nationals who are employees of the United Nations or its specialized agencies accredited by the Ministry of Foreign Affairs of Turkmenistan, as well as members of their families, are exempt from visa issuance during the period of work in Turkmenistan.

Non-ordinary passports

Holders of diplomatic or service category passports of Armenia, Azerbaijan, Belarus, Bulgaria, China, Czech Republic, Georgia, Hungary, Iran, Japan, Kazakhstan, Kyrgyzstan, Moldova, Mongolia, Romania, Russia, Slovakia, South Korea, Tajikistan, Turkey, Ukraine, United Arab Emirates and holders of diplomatic passports of Estonia, India, Pakistan and Uzbekistan do not require a visa to visit Turkmenistan. Holders of diplomatic passports of Canada, New Zealand, United Kingdom and the United States may obtain a free visa on arrival.

Admission refused
Entry and Transit is refused to  nationals and the holders of passports with

 
 
  DPR
  LPR
 
  SADR

Statistics

Turkmenistan is one of the most closed countries in the world. Very few foreigners are granted a Turkmenistani visa. Directly after independence, in the 1990s, Turkmenistan was a slightly more open country than it is now, and in 1998, for example, 300,000 foreigners visited the country. Between 2000 and 2013, however, the number of visas issued was tiny fitting a policy of isolationism, the neutral status of Turkmenistan and the dictatorship in that country.

Citizens of the Russian Federation

See also

Visa requirements for Turkmen citizens
Turkmenistan passport
Ashgabat International Airport
Turkmenistan Airlines

References

Links 
State Migration Service of Turkmenistan

Turkmenistan
Foreign relations of Turkmenistan